Ludmila Ezhova Grebenkova ( (Lyudmila Yezhova Grebenkova), born 4 March 1982) is a Russian former competitive gymnast. She won bronze in the team event at the 2004 Summer Olympics and four medals at the World Championships.

Career
Ezhova was a mainstay of the Russian team from the late 1990s to the mid-2000s. She also represented Russia at the 2008 Olympics in Beijing where she competed only balance beam. She was particularly noted for her work on balance beam where she was a four (4) time world and European medalist, including a gold medal. Her balance beam routines were characterized by a wide array of difficult acrobatic skills connected in immediate, unusual sequencing.

In 1997, Ezhova placed 8th in the all-around at Russian Championships. The following year she placed 10th in the all-around at the Russian Cup. In the Spring of 1998, she competed on uneven bars and balance beam in the team final at European Championships in Saint Petersburg, Russia. Individually, she earned a bronze medal on balance beam, tying with Romanian Simona Amânar. At the 1999 Russian Cup, Ezhova placed 9th in the all-around. Ezhova was not named to the World Team for Russia. In 2000, she was not named to the Russian team for European Championships or the Olympic Games.

Ezhova made the team for the 2001 World Championships in Ghent, Belgium. She competed on uneven bars, balance beam and floor exercise in the team final and helped earn the silver medal. Individually she earned a silver medal on balance beam. At the 2002 European Championships in Patras, Greece, she helped the Russian team earn the gold medal by competing on uneven bars and balance beam. Individually she won the gold medal on balance beam and placed 7th on the uneven bars. That same year she made her second World Championships team. There was no team competition at the 2002 World Championships but she earned a bronze medal on uneven bars and placed 6th place on balance beam. In 2003, Ezhova placed 13th at the Russian Championships.  At the 2003 World Championships in Anaheim, California, the Russian team of which Ezhova was a member, greatly faltered and placed 6th in the team competition. Individually, however, she earned a bronze medal on balance beam. Ezhova did not compete on the European Championships team. Later that year she made the team for the 2004 Athens Summer Olympics. At the Olympics, Ezhova competed on uneven bars and balance beam in both qualifications and the team final. The Russian team earned a bronze medal in the team competition. Individually, Ezhova did not advance to any individual finals.

In 2008 Grebenkova returned to gymnastics to compete at the 2008 Beijing Summer Olympics. Here she competed for the team on balance beam. The Russian team placed 4th in the team final.

Eponymous skill
Ezhova has one eponymous skill listed in the Code of Points.

More informations about the move can be found on the new gymnastics'database

Post-retirement
Ezhova-Grebenkova was a team and rec coach at Southeastern Gymnastics in Charlotte, North Carolina, along with her husband Georgy Grebenkov, also a former Olympic gymnast. Up until early 2018 she was a Gymnastics coach at WOGA Gymnastics.

As of spring of 2018 she and her husband own and coach at Golden Grip Gymnastics in Plano, Texas.

Competitive history

See also 

 List of Olympic female gymnasts for Russia

References
 Gymn Forum: Ludmilla Yezhova
 Gymn Forum: Results

External links
 
 
 
 

1982 births
Living people
Russian female artistic gymnasts
Olympic gymnasts of Russia
Gymnasts at the 2004 Summer Olympics
Gymnasts at the 2008 Summer Olympics
Medalists at the World Artistic Gymnastics Championships
Olympic bronze medalists for Russia
Olympic medalists in gymnastics
Medalists at the 2004 Summer Olympics
Originators of elements in artistic gymnastics
European champions in gymnastics